is a Japanese professional footballer currently playing as a midfielder for J3 League club Iwaki FC.

Career statistics

Club

Notes

References

External links

2000 births
Living people
Association football people from Ibaraki Prefecture
Japanese footballers
Association football midfielders
J2 League players
Kashima Antlers players
Tochigi SC players
Iwaki FC players